The Charlotte River   is a river of Grenada. The
Charlotte River is situated in the parish of St. John, in the town of Gouyave.

See also
List of rivers of Grenada

References
 GEOnet Names Server 
Grenada map

Rivers of Grenada